Liebenthal may refer to:

People 
 Walter Liebenthal, Sinologist (1886-1982)

Towns 
 Liebenthal, Kansas
 Liebenthal bei Hirschberg, the former German name for Lubomierz, a town in Lwówek Śląski County, Lower Silesian Voivodeship, in southwestern Poland
 Liebenthal, Saskatchewan

Villages 
 Pionerskoye (Sovetsky District) (Liebental), Sovetsky District, Russia
 Libňatov (Liebenthal), Trutnov District, Czech Republic
 Liptaň (Liebenthal), Bruntál District, Czech Republic
 Dolni Dobrouc (Liebenthal), Ústí nad Orlicí District, Czech Republic